The 2022 Pennzoil 400 presented by Jiffy Lube was the third stock car race of the 2022 NASCAR Cup Series and the 25th running of the event. The race was held on Sunday, March 6, 2022, in North Las Vegas, Nevada at Las Vegas Motor Speedway, a  permanent D-shaped oval racetrack. The race was extended from its scheduled 267 laps to 274 due to a NASCAR overtime caused by a crash including Erik Jones and Bubba Wallace. At race's end, Alex Bowman, driving for Hendrick Motorsports, would manage to climb to the front on the final restart and held off fellow teammate and eventual second-place finisher Kyle Larson to win his seventh career NASCAR Cup Series win and his first of the season. To fill out the top 3, Ross Chastain of the Trackhouse Racing Team would finish third.

Report

Background

Las Vegas Motor Speedway, located in Clark County, Nevada outside the Las Vegas city limits and about 15 miles northeast of the Las Vegas Strip, is a  complex of multiple tracks for motorsports racing. The complex is owned by Speedway Motorsports, Inc., which is headquartered in Charlotte, North Carolina.

Entry list
 (R) denotes rookie driver.
 (i) denotes driver who is ineligible for series driver points.

Practice

Practice results

Qualifying

Qualifying results

Race

Stage Results

Stage One
Laps: 80

Stage Two
Laps: 85

Final Stage Results

Stage Three
Laps: 102

Race statistics
 Lead changes: 23 among 15 different drivers
 Cautions/Laps: 12 for 60
 Red flags: 0
 Time of race: 3 hours, 29 minutes and 50 seconds
 Average speed:

Media

Television
Fox Sports covered their 22nd race at the Las Vegas Motor Speedway. Mike Joy, Clint Bowyer, and Danica Patrick called the race from the broadcast booth. Jamie Little and Regan Smith handled pit road, and Larry McReynolds provided insight from the Fox Sports studio in Charlotte.

Radio
PRN covered the radio call for the race which was also simulcasted on Sirius XM NASCAR Radio. Doug Rice and Mark Garrow called the race in the booth where the field raced through the tri-oval. Rob Albright called the race from a billboard in turn 2 where the field raced through turns 1 and 2. Pat Patterson called the race from a billboard outside of turn 3 where the field raced through turns 3 and 4. Brad Gillie, Brett McMillan, Wendy Venturini, and Heather Debeaux worked pit road for the radio side.

Standings after the race

Drivers' Championship standings

Manufacturers' Championship standings

Note: Only the first 16 positions are included for the driver standings.

References

2022 in sports in Nevada
2022 NASCAR Cup Series
March 2022 sports events in the United States
NASCAR races at Las Vegas Motor Speedway